Roger Nelson Stembel (December 27, 1810 – November 20, 1900) was an officer of the United States Navy during the Civil War.

Early life
Stembel, born in Middletown, Maryland, was appointed midshipman in the United States Navy on March 27, 1832. He served in the West Indies, Mediterranean, Home, Brazil, China, and East India Squadrons prior to the Civil War.

Civil War
During the Civil War, Stembel served in the Western Gunboat Flotilla during 1861 and 1862. He participated in the engagements of Lucas' Bend, September 9, 1861; Belmont, November 1861; Fort Henry, February 1862; and the bombardment and capture of Island No. 10 in March and April 1862. While commanding the Cincinnati, Stembel was seriously wounded in an engagement with Confederate rams near Fort Pillow on May 10, 1862, and invalided in 1863.

Stembel was assigned shore duty at Pittsburgh, Pennsylvania in 1864 and 1865. After being promoted to captain in 1866, he commanded  in the European Squadron from 1865 to 1867. He was stationed at Boston, Massachusetts in 1869 and was promoted to Commodore in 1871. In that year, he assumed command of the North Squadron of the Pacific Fleet; and, in 1872, he assumed command of the Pacific Fleet as well. 
With the fall of Confederate Fort Henry he, along with Captain Seth Ledyard Phelps, were sent by flag officer Andrew Hull Foote to hoist the American flag over the captured fort, marking the turning point of the Civil War.

He retired on December 27, 1872, and was promoted to rear admiral on June 5, 1874. Admiral Stembel died in New York City on November 20, 1900. He is buried in Arlington National Cemetery, Virginia.
The destroyer  was named in his honor. Stembel was the son in law of James McBride of Hamilton, Ohio, and therefore connected with several prominent politicians related to the Lytle family.

See also
 Ulysses S. Grant
 Bibliography of the American Civil War

References

Sources

External links
 Arlington National Cemetery: Roger Nelson Stembel
 Stembel Family History; see Henry Stembel

1810 births
1900 deaths
United States Navy rear admirals
People from Middletown, Maryland
Burials at Arlington National Cemetery